İZBAN, previously known as Egeray, is a commuter rail system serving İzmir and its metropolitan area, mainly on a north–south axis, via two lines: The Northern Line and the Southern Line. Averaging a daily ridership of 185,000 passengers, it is the busiest commuter rail system in Turkey, slightly ahead of the Marmaray commuter line in Istanbul. İZBAN is a portmanteau of the words "İzmir" and "Banliyö" (suburb in Turkish).

Established in 2007 and began operations in 2010, İZBAN was formed to revive old commuter rail in İzmir.

İZBAN A.Ş., founded in 2006, operates the railway and is owned 50% by the Turkish State Railways and 50% by the İzmir Metropolitan Municipality. İZBAN is a part of the municipality's transportation master plan.

Fares

Routes
İZBAN currently has four routes; The Aliağa-Cumaovası, serving the central districts of the city and into Aliağa, The Southern Line, serving the central districts, Adnan Menderes Airport, the southern town of Menderes and the southern town of Torbalı, The Tepeköy-Selçuk which connects the town of Torbalı with the town of Selçuk, The Çiğli-Halkapınar line only runs during rush hours on weekends in order to reduce pressure on The Aliağa-Cumaovası and The Menemen-Tepeköy lines.  Apart from The Tepeköy-Selçuk line, all lines run through the central districts providing 8 trains per hour in the central district

History
İZBAN A.Ş. was jointly created on 10 January 2007 by the İzmir Municipality and the Turkish State Railways to operate commuter service within the city. Previously commuter service was operated by the State Railways but service wasn't very frequent and trains weren't as efficient. By 2006 commuter ridership within İzmir was at its all time lowest with only 98,000 boardings that year. This followed a steady decrease in ridership since the 1990s. In order to revive commuter service in the city, the State Railways executed a complete overhaul of their two lines within the city. On 23 July 2006 the State Railways temporarily suspended all rail service into İzmir. Regional and intercity trains would terminate at Çiğli in the north and Gaziemir in the south.

During this time, the 24 existing commuter stations were rebuilt and 5 new stations were added. 15 new bus transfer terminals were added to integrate commuter service with the citywide bus service ESHOT. All grade crossings were converted to overpasses or underpasses with the exception of 7 crossings that were operational when service began. Today, only 3 remain and will be removed in the near future. Two railway tunnels were built in Karşıyaka and Şirinyer with a total of 4 underground stations and the railway's former right of way were converted into parks. Tracks were relaid with cement ties and signalization was upgraded to a central control station at Alsancak. Turnstiles were added at stations to integrate them with the citywide smartcard, Kentkart. A new maintenance facility was opened in Çiğli as well as a small yard was opened in Cumaovası for the trains. Works on the southern line finished in mid-2009 and regional service was restored to Basmane station. Works on the Northern Line finished in Spring 2010 and service was restored on 1 May 2010.

Service

Currently, İZBAN operates 164 daily trains in both directions between Cumaovası and Aliağa. All of the tracks are owned by the Turkish State Railways. There are also bus terminals integrated with several new stations. These stations are: Halkapınar, Şirinyer, Semt Garajı, Esbaş, Sarnıç and Cumaovası on the Southern Line, Mavişehir, Çiğli, Egekent 2, Hatundere, Biçerova, Menemen and Ulukent on the Northern Line.

Ridership
İZBAN is by far the busiest commuter railroad in Turkey, carrying more passengers than the rest of Turkey's other commuter railroads combined. The average daily ridership is about 100,000. In its first month, İZBAN carried about 2,000 passengers daily, this grew to 40,000 by the end of December and doubled to 80,000 by February. With the opening of the rail-bus transfers on the Northern Line, daily ridership has increased to 100,000. This is expected to rise to 140,000 by April. İZBAN, at 6 months old had carried more than 1.6 million passengers from its opening on August 30, 2010, making it one of the world's fastest growing commuter railroads. Below is a list of the top 10 busiest stations on the system as of September 2011.

Rolling stock

Future Extension

Aliağa-Bergama 
İZBAN plans to extend the line 55 km north of Aliağa to Bergama. The goal of this project is to link the ancient cities of Pergamon and Ephesus with İzmir by rail.

Suspended

Menemen-Manisa
An extension to Manisa is planned and construction is expected to begin towards the end of 2011. This would mean the upgrading of several stations (Emiralem, Ayvacık, Muradiye, Horozköy) and a major upgrade of the Manisa Railway Station, as well as adding a few new stations to serve all villages near the line(Yahşelli, Göktepe). Together with this, the existing single track line, would be made double track and electrified with 25 kV AC overhead wire.

Gallery

See also
İzmir Metro
Rail transport in İzmir
Tram Izmir

References

External links

 İZBAN A.Ş. official website

 
Rail transport in İzmir
Railway companies of Turkey
Airport rail links in Turkey